The Maltese ambassador in Washington, D. C. is the official representative of the Government in Valletta to the Government of the United States.

List of representatives

References 

 
United States
Malta